American singer-songwriter Woody Guthrie's published recordings are culled from a series of recording sessions in the 1940s and 1950s. At the time they were recorded they were not set down for a particular album, so are found  over several albums not necessarily in chronological order. The more detailed section on recording sessions lists the song by recording date.

Selected published discography

Recording sessions

The list here is organized by recording session and is mostly sourced from the discography put together by Dr. Guy Lodgson in 1990-1991 at the Smithsonian Institution as it appears in the book "Hard Travelin' The Life and Legacy of Woody Guthrie".

Note: A blank cell below a date indicate that the date is repeated on that row.

1940, Library Of Congress, Washington, D.C., sessions with Alan Lomax

American Studio of the Air, Radio Show

1940, RCA Victor Sessions, Dust Bowl Ballads

* These recording were released on the record Talking Dust Bowl on Folkways Records in 1950 by Moe Asch, but without RCA's licences. 
All these recordings were made by RCA Records in 1940 and released on the albums Dust Bowl Ballads vol 1 and 2. These records have been subsequently reissued in 1964 and 1977.

1941, Bonneville Power Administration, The Columbia River Songs
The masters of this session were lost, but a collection of 6 discs was collected from BPA employee copies from the time. Most were eventually released on Rounder Records Woody Guthrie, Columbia River Collection C1036 in 1987. The 6 discs are housed in the National Archives, Washington D.C. The catalogue numbers here relate to National Archive listings.

Unissued LOC Recordings: Home Disc Recordings & 1941 Almanac Singers
Series of Discs for the Library of Congress, recorded by the Almanac Singers, only those written by or featuring Woody Guthrie are included here. Notes are Woody's parts.

Keynote Recordings

 * Songs that have been released on Songs for Political Action, Bear Family Records BCD 15270

General Records

The Martins and the Coys: A Contemporary Folk Tale
Recorded by Decca Records in March 1944, and written by Elizabeth Lomax. Alan Lomax shopped this around but no stations were interested, eventually it was sold the BBC.
The recordings included Woody as well as several members of the Almanac singers.

1944 & 1945, The Asch Recordings
Possibly Guthrie's most famous recordings, conducted over a series of days by Moses "Moe" Asch in 1944 and 1945. They were issued on a variety of labels under Asch, Asch-Stinson, Asch-Signature-Stinson, Disc, Folkways and Verve/Folkways.

Many recordings have unknown session dates. These are included in a list available at the United States Library of Congress titled "Surviving Recordings in the Smithsonian Folklife Archive Made by Woody Guthrie for Moses Asch". Moe Asch says Woody's kids song were recorded sometime in early 1947 and the Sacco and Vanzetti ballads were recorded January 1947.

1947 Songs to Grow On
The recording dates for the Songs to Grow On series of children's song are mostly lost due to the record keeping of Moe Asch, but the tracks are included here as they are some of Guthrie's most well known tracks. In this case the Date is the release date of the original 78 records.

Honors

On September 6, 2007, Woody Guthrie Publications, Inc., in cooperation with the Woody Guthrie Foundation released The Live Wire: Woody Guthrie in Performance 1949, accompanied by a 72-page book describing the performance and the project. Paul Braverman, a student at Rutgers University in 1949, made the recordings himself using a small wire recorder at a Guthrie concert in Newark, New Jersey.[10] On February 10, 2008, the release was the recipient of a Grammy Award in the category Best Historical Album.[11]

References

 
Discography
Discographies of American artists
Folk music discographies